Runway Australian Experimental Art is an independent Australian experimental art journal run by a collective of Sydney-based and internationally based artists, writers and Curators.

The first issue of the journal was published in 2002 by the Australian artist-run initiative Invisible Inc. Runway was published exclusively in print until it was relaunched at the end of 2013 as an ejournal. In 2015, The Art Life described the editorial board at the time as troublemakers "crowding at the edges" of its annual list of the 50 most powerful people in Australian art.

References 

Visual art journals
Arts organisations based in Australia
Australian artist groups and collectives
Australian contemporary art
Contemporary art magazines